Maja Šuput (born 22 September 1979) is a Croatian singer, actress, television host, and model. 

She started her career in 1998 as a member of the Croatian group Enjoy, but left in 2002, to pursue her solo career.

Since 2017, Šuput has been a judge on Nova TV's reality show Supertalent, together with Davor Bilman, Janko Popović Volarić, and Martina Tomčić.

Biography 
Šuput was born on 22 September 1979, in Zagreb, as the only child of mother Danica and father Boris Šuput.

Personal life 
Her father Boris died in October 2018. On 12 May 2019, Šuput married a businessman, Nenad Tatarinov, at a private ceremony in Istria. 

On 17 March 2021, Maja gave birth to a son named Bloom.

Discography 
Enjoy (2000)
Uzmi me (2001)
Čista 5-ica (2003)
Obori me s nogu (2006)
Nevaljala (2011)
Showgirl (2015)

Filmography  
 Tvoje lice zvuči poznato – host (2020) 
 Zvijezde pod hipnozom – guest (2019)
 Ples sa zvijezdama – guest (2019)
 Exkluziv Tabloid 
 Top.HR – guest
 Špica, riva, korzo – guest (2018)
 Supertalent – judge (2017–present) 
 Sve u šest
 Tvoje lice zvuči poznato – guest judge (2015, 2018)
 Volim Hrvatsku (2012) 
 IN Magazin 
 Ne zaboravi stihove (2009)
 Zauvijek susjedi – Maria (2008)
 Naša mala klinika – Herself (2006)
 Red Carpet

Synchronization 
 UglyDolls – Moksi (2019)

References

External links 
 
 

Living people
1979 births
Croatian pop singers
Croatian folk-pop singers
Musicians from Zagreb
21st-century Croatian women singers
Croatian LGBT rights activists